The name Sharon has been used for four tropical cyclones worldwide.

Eastern Pacific:
 Tropical Storm Sharon (1971)

Western Pacific: 
Tropical Storm Sharon (1991) (T9101, 01W, Auring)
Tropical Storm Sharon (1994) (T9404, 06W, Gading)

Australian Region: 
Cyclone Sharon (1993)

See also 
 Hurricane Shary, a similar name which has been used in the Atlantic Ocean.

Pacific hurricane set index articles
Pacific typhoon set index articles
Australian region cyclone set index articles